Marten is both a surname and a given name. Notable people with the name include:

Surname 
Alfred Marten (1829–1910), English politician and barrister
Barbara Marten (born 1947), British actress
Grisha Heyliger-Marten (born 1976), Sint Maarten politician
Henry Marten (politician) (c. 1562 – 1641), Tudor politician
Henry Marten (regicide) (1602–1680), his son
Henry Marten (MCC cricketer) (1768–1842), cricketer
Henry Marten (educator) (1872–1948), Provost of Eton
James Marten (born 1984) American football player
John  Marten (died 1473), English academic; see John Martyn (academic)
John Chisholm Marten (1908–1966), Australian founder of the Marten Bequest, for various types of creative artists
John Thomas Marten (born 1951), United States federal judge
Maritza Martén (born 1963), Cuban discus thrower
Mary Anna Marten (1929-2010), British landowner and archaeologist
Neil Marten (1916–1985), British politician
Roy Marten (born 1952), Indonesian actor
Ulrich Marten  (born 1956), West German professional tennis player 
William Marten (1845–1907), English cricketer

Given name 
Marten
Marten von Barnekow (1900–1967), German equestrian
Marten Beinema (1932–2008), Dutch politician
Marten Burkens (born 1934), Dutch legal scholar and politician
Marten van Cleve (1527–1581), Flemish painter and draftsman
Marten Cumberland (1892–1972), British journalist, novelist and editor
Marten Eikelboom (born 1973), Dutch field hockey player
Marten Gasparini (born 1997), Italian baseball player
Marten Jozef Geeraerts (1707–1791), Flemish historical painter
Marten Hartwell (1925–2013), Canadian bush pilot 
Marten Hamkes (c.1550–1620), Dutch Frisian writer, poet and historian
Marten Heemskerck van der Heck (1620–1660), Dutch painter
Marten Jacobsz Heemskerk van Veen (1498–1574), Dutch portrait and religious painter
Marten Hoekstra (born 1961), American CEO of a financial services company
Marten Joustra, British video game and jazz composer
Marten Kapewasha (born 1949), Namibian diplomat and politician
Marten Mendez (1916–1994), American badminton player
Marten Pepijn (1575–1643), Flemish history and genre painter
Marten Post (born 1942), Dutch visual artist
Marten Rijckaert (1587–1631), Flemish landscape painter
Marten Rudelsheim (1873–1920), Flemish movement activist
Marten Schagen (1700–1770), Dutch Mennonite bookseller and translator
Marten Scheffer (born 1958), Dutch ecologist
Marten Sonk (c.1590–1625), Dutch Governor of Formosa
Marten Strauch (born 1986), German rugby player
Marten Douwes Teenstra (1795–1864), Dutch writer and traveller 
Marten Toonder (1912–2005), Dutch comic creator
Marten van Valckenborch (1535–1612), Flemish Renaissance painter
Marten van der Veen (born 1946), British Royal Air Force officer
Marten van Riel (born 1992), Belgian triathlete
Marten de Vos (1532–1603), Flemish painter and draughtsman
Marten Waefelaerts (1748–1799), Flemish landscape painter
Marten Holden Weiner, American television actor
Marten Yorgantz (born 1946), French-Armenian singer and composer
 Mårten
Mårten Andersson (born 1974), Swedish bassist with Lizzy Borden
Mårten Boström (born 1982), Finnish orienteering competitor and long-distance runner
Mårten Falk (born 1973), Swedish classical guitarist
Mårten Hagström (born 1971), Swedish guitarist with Meshuggah
Mårten Klingberg (born 1968), Swedish actor, screenwriter and director
Mårten Mickos (born 1962) Finnish software executive
Mårten Olander (born 1971), Swedish golfer
Mårten Palme (born 1961), Swedish economist
Mårten Renström (born 1972), Swedish tennis player
Mårten Triewald (1691–1747), Swedish merchant, engineer and physicist
Mårten Eskil Winge (1825–1896), Swedish mythology painter

Fictional characters:
Marten Broadcloak, alias of Stephen King character Randall Flagg
Marten Reed, character in Questionable Content

See also
Martens (surname)
Maarten, given name
Martin (disambiguation)

Dutch masculine given names 
Surnames from given names